Ibn Hibintā (fl. 950) was a Christian in Iraq known from an Arabic manuscript on Islamic astrology al-Mughnī fī aḥkām al-nujūm, the second part of which is preserved in Munich. 

Hibinta's lived during the reign of the Buwayhid rulers Ahmad ibn Buwayh (946–949) and ʿAḍūd al-Dawla (949–982) at Baghdad. His only known  work, the Kitab al-Mughnī fī aḥkām al-nujūm (literally, the enriching book of the judgement of the stars) includes notes from Ptolemy, Dorotheus of Sidon, al-Khwarizmi and the Indian astrologer Kanaka. A manuscript copy of the second part is held as Arabic Codex 852 at the Bayerische Staatsbibliothek, Munich.

References 

Astrologers of the medieval Islamic world
Arab astronomers
Scholars under the Buyid dynasty
Christian astrologers
Christians under the Buyid dynasty